Nils Reine Fiske (born 4 October 1972) is a Swedish guitarist, art director and sound engineer at the record label Subliminal Sounds, who put his signature to many prog-rock projects such as Landberk, Morte Macabre, Paatos, Motorpsycho, Elephant9, and Träd, Gräs & Stenar. He is best known for his playing in the band Dungen.

Career

Fiske was born in Saltsjö-Boo, Sweden. He plays in The Amazing with Christopher Gunrup, has also played with the band Reform, and is a member of Sylvester Schlegel's band The Guild, in addition to those already mentioned. 

In 2012 he released Still Life With Eggplant with the band Svenska Kaputt (Fiske, Jonas Kullhammar, Torbjörn Zetterberg and Johan Holmegard). He also released Behind the Sun with the Norwegian prog-rock band Motorpsycho, and Atlantis with another Norwegian prog-rock band, Elephant9, comprising the trio Ståle Storløkken, Nikolai Eilertsen and Torstein Lofthus. The latter appeared at Kongsberg Jazz Festival 2012.  

He is a member of Träd, Gräs & Stenar.

Discography
With Landberk
Lonely Land (The Laser's Edge, 1992)
One Man Tell's Another (Megarock Records, 1994)
Riktigt Äkta (Record Heaven Music, 1995)
Unaffected (Melodie & Dissonanze, 1995)
Indian Summer (Musea, 1996)

With Morte Macabre
Symphonic Holocaust (Musea, 1998)

With Paatos
Timeloss (Stockholm Records, 2002)

With Dungen
Stadsvandringar (Dolores Recordings, Virgin Records, 2002)
Ta Det Lugnt (Subliminal Sounds, 2004)
Dungen: 1999–2001 (Subliminal Sounds, 2005), compilation
Panda (Memphis Industries, 2005)
Tio Bitar (Subliminal Sounds, 2007)
Sätt Att Se (Subliminal Sounds, 2008)
4 (Subliminal Sounds, 2008)
Skit I Allt (Subliminal Sounds, 2010)
Öga, Näsa, Mun (Third Man Records, 2011)
Allas Sak  (2015)
Häxan  (2016)

With S.T. Mikael
Mind of Fire (Subliminal Sounds, 2007)

With Anna Järvinen
Jag Fick Feeling (Häpna, 2007)
Man Var Bland Molnen (Häpna, 2009)
Anna Själv Tredje (Stranded Rekords, Universal Music, 2011)

With The Guild
The Golden Thumb (2009)

With Träd, Gräs och Stenar
Hemlösa Katter / Homeless Cats (Gåshud, 2009)
Träden (Gåshud / Subliminal Sounds, 2019)

With The Amazing
The Amazing (Subliminal Sounds, 2009)
Wait for a Light to Come (Subliminal Sounds, 2010)
Gentle Stream (Subliminal Sounds, 2011)
Picture You (Partisan Records, 2015)

With Elephant9
Atlantis (Rune Grammofon, 2012)
Silver Mountain (Rune Grammofon, 2015)

With Motorpsycho
Still Life With Eggplant (Rune Grammofon, 2013)
Behind The Sun (Rune Grammofon, 2014)

References

External links
The Guild on Myspace
Emerald Tree on Myspace

Motorpsycho members
20th-century guitarists
21st-century guitarists
Swedish guitarists
Male guitarists
1972 births
Living people
Swedish male musicians